Minuscule 776 (in the Gregory-Aland numbering), ε1228 (von Soden), is a Greek minuscule manuscript of the New Testament written on parchment. Palaeographically it has been assigned to the 11th century. The manuscript has complex contents.

Description 
The codex contains the text of the four Gospels, on 387 parchment leaves (size ). The text is written in two columns per page, 19 lines per page.

There is also another division according to the smaller Ammonian Sections (in Mark 241 sections - the last in 16:20), with references to the Eusebian Canons.

Text 

The Greek text of the codex is a representative of the Byzantine text-type with some alien readings. Hermann von Soden classified it to the textual family Iκ. Kurt Aland the Greek text of the codex did not place in any Category.
According to the Claremont Profile Method it represent the textual family M106 in Luke 1, Luke 10, and Luke 20.

The lacks the texts of Matthew 16:2b–3 (added by later hand in the margin) and Pericope Adulterae (John 7:53-8:11). The text of Luke 22:43-44 is marked by an obelus.

History 
C. R. Gregory dated the manuscript to the 11th century. The manuscript is currently dated by the INTF to the 11th century.

The name of the scribe was Symeon, a monk.

The manuscript was noticed in a catalogue from 1876.

It was added to the list of New Testament manuscripts by Gregory (776). Gregory saw the manuscript in 1886.

The manuscript is now housed at the National Library of Greece (76) in Athens.

See also 

 List of New Testament minuscules
 Biblical manuscript
 Textual criticism
 Minuscule 775

References

Further reading 

 

Greek New Testament minuscules
11th-century biblical manuscripts
Manuscripts of the National Library of Greece